The commune of Marangara is a commune of Ngozi Province in northern Burundi. The capital lies at Marangara.

See also 
Commune of Busiga

References

Communes of Burundi
Ngozi Province